Elston Grove Historic District is a national historic district located at Crawfordsville, Montgomery County, Indiana.  The district encompasses 138 contributing buildings and 8 contributing structures in a predominantly residential section of Crawfordsville.  It developed between about 1835 and 1935, and includes notable examples of Italianate, Queen Anne, and Colonial Revival style architecture.  Located in the district are the separately listed Col. Isaac C. Elston House, Henry S. Lane House, and Gen. Lew Wallace Study.  Other notable buildings include the Galey House (1848), Campbell House (1852), T.S. Scott House (c. 1855), Powers House (1862), Blair House (c. 1863), Hadley and Hornaday Houses (1878), Alfrey House (1885), Detchon House (c. 1895), Ashley House (c. 1890), Snyder House (c. 1903), and Voris House (c. 1920).

It was listed on the National Register of Historic Places in 1992.

References

Historic districts on the National Register of Historic Places in Indiana
Italianate architecture in Indiana
Queen Anne architecture in Indiana
Colonial Revival architecture in Indiana
Historic districts in Montgomery County, Indiana
National Register of Historic Places in Montgomery County, Indiana
Crawfordsville, Indiana